Aref Thabit Al-Dali (born October 2, 1987) is a Yemeni professional footballer who plays for Yemeni League outfit Al-Oruba represented Yemen in the 2011 AFC Asian Cup qualification matches.

References

Living people
Yemeni footballers
Yemen international footballers
Place of birth missing (living people)
May 22 San'a players
Al-Oruba (Yemeni) players
Yemeni League players
Association football defenders
1987 births